The Invisible Party (Osynliga partiet) was a Swedish conceptual anti-capitalist media campaign masquerading as an "organization" with the purpose of connecting all anti-capitalist action, however small or without actual realization, to an "invisible" political party.

Although it called itself a party, it did not have official members but instead had participants. It could not, and did not wish to, participate in elections. The professed goal of the group was to undermine the capitalist system. It was founded by different parts of the Swedish extra-parliamentary left, in particular the Swedish Anarcho-syndicalist Youth Federation.

The Invisible Party "disbanded" after a September 16, 2006 press release by the "central committee" behind the campaign declaring that they would discontinue their activities:

Ideology

The Invisible Party can be seen as a shared concept, a symbol for a struggle against capitalism and the perceived exploitation of the workforce. Participation in the party has involved strikes, blockades, flyposting, sabotage, shoplifting, riots, and other radical tactics.

Anna-Lena Lodenius, a Swedish author on political extremism, has described the Invisible Party as follows:

The leftist website Motkraft described the views of the group as follows:

Methods
After the Centre Party proposed a special youth contract for those under 26 (similar to France's First Employment Contract policy), activists claiming to be members of the Invisible Party responded by vandalizing Centre Party offices throughout Sweden. The Centre Party was in opposition at the time.

Activists under the banner of the Invisible Party continued the vandalism throughout the 2006 Swedish general election campaign, hitting the offices of the Christian Democrats, another opposition party, as well.

As of 2006, the Swedish Security Service (Säpo) was gathering information about the Invisible Party and its supporters.

Controversy
The Invisible Party was widely misunderstood outside the extra-parliamentary left. Media presented the party as an actual organization with members in the strict and traditional sense. Because of the actions against the Centre Party the party was vilified by Swedish media and presented as a violent and anti-democratic organization. This led to the true purpose of the campaign becoming even more obscure than before. The winner of the Swedish political reality show Toppkandidaterna (The Top Candidates), Petter Nilsson, donated 100,000 of his 250,000 SEK prize-money to the project. After the actions against the Centre Party, the party demanded that the license-funded public broadcaster SVT should ask Nilsson to repay the money, and the Centre Party Youth claimed that SVT was "responsible for the attacks", but SVT chose not to take any action against Nilsson.

See also
 Anarchism
 Alter-globalization (or Anti-globalization)
 Distributive justice
 The Global Economy
 Politics of Sweden
 direct action

Notes

External links
  News about activity in the Invisible Party
  Newsblog about the Invisible Party
  Motkraft.net
  Resumé: "SVT bekostar 'Osynliga partiets' sajt"
  SvD: "Osynliga partiet bjöd på saft"
 The Local: "More Centre Party offices vandalised"
 The Local: "New attack on Centre Party offices"

Anti-capitalist organizations
Autonomism
Political organizations based in Sweden